Coursetia is a large genus of flowering plants in the pea family, Fabaceae. Members of the genus, commonly known as babybonnets, are shrubs and small trees native to the Southwestern United States, Mexico, the Caribbean, Central America, and South America as far south as Brazil and Peru. The genus is named for French botanist Georges Louis Marie Dumont de Courset (1746–1824).

Selected species

References

External links
 USDA PLANTS Profile
 
 

Robinieae
Fabaceae genera